Bertrand Badré was born on 10 May 1968. He is the son of Denis Badré, Senator of Hauts-de-Seine until 2011 and mayor of Ville d'Avray. Bertrand Badré is CEO and Founder of BlueOrange Capital, an investment fund that aims to finance the Sustainable Development Goals with market level financial returns. Previously, Badré served as managing director and Chief Financial Officer of the World Bank Group. Badré also held key positions at Société Générale, Crédit Agricole and Lazard, and was an advisor to previous French President Jacques Chirac’s diplomatic team. He is currently a member or chairs numerous boards panels, committees, and research institutions, and teaches in a number of universities. His most recent book is titled  “Money Honnie, si la finance sauvait le monde?” with a foreword from Gordon Brown, former prime minister of the UK and which explores Badré's experience throughout the financial crisis and how we can reboot the system. The English version of the book “Can finance save the world? Regaining control over money to serve common good” has been prefaced by the president of France, Emmanuel Macron. The book has also been translated into Italian, Russian, and Chinese.

Biography 

Badré holds a master's degree in history from La Sorbonne, after graduating from the renowned business school HEC Paris in 1989. He also attended the prestigious ENA (École nationale d'administration) and Sciences Po. Badré began his career in 1989 at BFI-Ibexsa, a Franco-American company that is now part of Avnet. From 1995 to 1999, he worked at the French Ministry of Finance, where he led a number of control, audit and consultancy missions for the French National Audit Office, "Inspection Générale des Finances."

In 1999, Badré joined Lazard, where he became vice president in the London office, Director in the New York office, and managing director in the Paris office. He led several mergers, acquisitions, disposals, and restructuring projects, including the successfully restructuring of Eurotunnel.

In 2002, Badré was a member of the World Panel on Financing Water Infrastructure chaired by Michel Camdessus, a panel of financial experts to assess ways of attracting resources to the water field.

In 2003, Badré joined President Jacques Chirac’s office in Paris as Advisor and Deputy Africa Personal Representative. In this capacity he supported the organization of the Evian G8 Summit including the G8 Water plan and G8-Nepad partnership. His participation in key international summits (AIDS, Water, UN General Assembly) contributed to designing the financial concept and structure leading to the Iffim/GAVI preliminary discussions. Badré was also involved in drafting the “Landau Report”, which enabled the creation of UNITAID with over 2B$ raised through a small levy on plane tickets.

In 2007, Badré became Group Chief Financial Officer of Crédit Agricole Group. He played a critical role in crisis management throughout the global financial crisis and the Eurozone crisis. In particular, he ensured the timely initiation of a 5.9Bn Euros rights issue prior to the Lehman bankruptcy and refused to increase the Greek debt exposure in 2008–09. He led intense communication with authorities, clients, shareholders, mutual stakeholders; and reshuffling of financial communication. During his time at Crédit Agricole, Badré also served as Vice Chairman of SFEF, the vehicle created by the government to support banks and financing of the Economy in 2008. Badré was elected Financial Sector CFO of the year in 2011 and number 3 all categories (#1 for CAC 40) in 2010.

Between 2012 and 2013, Badré held the office of Group Chief Financial Officer of Société Générale Group. He directed treasury, planning and control, accounting, strategy and M&A in a peak crisis period.

In 2013, Badré was appointed managing director and CFO of the World Bank Group, becoming G7 and G20 Finance Deputy and a Member of Financial Stability Board. His tenure oversaw a balance sheet optimization, the creation of a finance and risk committee, as well as the complete restructuring of planning process. Badré is particularly known for leading WBG efforts on Financing for Development. He contributed to the breakthrough joint International Monetary Fund/EIB/Multilateral development bank “Billions to Trillions” report, focusing on developing countries’ capacity to mobilize public and private resources and on public/private cooperation.

He also co-chairs the Global Future Council of the World Economic Forum on Sustainable Development, Public Private Cooperation and International governance which promotes the same ideas.

Badré is known for his commitment to delivering both financial value and sustainable growth aligned to the SDG targets. In 2016, Badré founded BlueOrange, which seeks to connect investors interested in combining market level financial returns with measurable social, economic and environmental returns. In June 2020, Blue like an Orange Sustainable Capital has closed its first fund, raising just over $200 million for its Latin America Fund.

Bertrand Badré recently launched his own website where he regularly publishes his thoughts and ideas about the post COVID-19 economic recovery and climate action. On September 11, 2020, his book "Do we (seriously) want to change the world?" is published by Mame editions to rethink the world and finance after the COVID-19 crisis.

Bertrand Badré is a young leader of the French-American Foundation and an alumnus of the German Marshall Fund of the US. He is also part of the Board of Directors of the French Aspen Institute.

Badré is co-sponsor of the One Planet Lab, a group of experts selected by Emmanuel Macron to help him identify and strive for clear and accessible climate policy goals, along with Paul Polman, and Nicolas Stern (Professor at the London School of Economics).

Badré is also a member of the advisory board of Project Syndicate, where he often writes about regulation of financial markets for sustainable development.

References 

Rencontre discrète d’Emmanuel Macron avec l’ancien directeur financier de la banque mondiale Rencontre discrète d’Emmanuel Macron avec l’ancien directeur financier de la banque mondiale M6info	 
World Bank (2014). 
World Bank (2012). World Bank Group Announces Bertrand Badré as Managing Director for Finance and CFO December 8, 2012.
Australian School of Business (February 25, 2014). World Bank's Bertrand Badré discusses key G20 issues Retrieved August 26, 2014.
Yeates, Clancy (February 24, 2014). New ways to fund infrastructure needed, says World Bank chief Bertrand Badre Sidney Morning Herald. Retrieved August 26, 2014.
Yukhananov, Anna (October 7, 2013). Exclusive: World Bank to cut $400 million from budget in reorganization Reuters. Retrieved August 26, 2014.
 Rastello, Sandrene and Benedetti-Valentini, Fabio (December 18, 2012). Societe Generale’s Bertrand Badre Named World Bank CFO Bloomberg. Retrieved August 26, 2014
 https://tedxiheparis.fr/speakers/bertrand-badre/

1968 births
Living people
Chief financial officers
Paris-Sorbonne University alumni
French bankers
HEC Paris alumni
Sciences Po alumni
École nationale d'administration alumni
People from Versailles